XOG or xog may refer to:

 XOG, the IATA code of the Orange-Caritat Air Base in France
 xog, the ISO 639 code of the Soga language of Uganda